The Fog Horn & Other Stories is a collection of six short stories written by Ray Bradbury.  The collection, published in Japan, is published in English for school use.

Contents
 "The Fog Horn"
 "The Dwarf"
 "The Pedestrian"
 "A Sound of Thunder"
 "En La Noche"
 "The Garbage Collector"

References

External links
 
 

1979 short story collections
Short story collections by Ray Bradbury